Cyrtanthus obliquus, the Knysna lily, is a species of plant in the amaryllis family with spiraling leaves and large pendulous flowers. It is native to coastal grassland from KwaZulu-Natal to the Eastern Cape, South Africa.

It is adapted to a dry winter period (March to August) in its native range, and is able to survive in hot, dry conditions. Its thick, greyish leaves are also adapted to this sunny environment. It is a popular container plant. It can be multiplied by removing and planting side bulbs, when these appear.

References

External links 

Amaryllidoideae